Paula Clamp (born 1967 in Nottinghamshire, England) is a British novelist, playwright and Visiting Lecturer at the University of Ulster.

Her first two novels, described as "Northern Irish chick-lit", were best-sellers in Ireland. She has previously held the post of Arts Officer for North Down Borough Council and has master's degrees in Cultural Management and Anglo-Irish Literature.

Bibliography
Standing in a Hammock (2002), 
Beetle Mania (2003),

References

1967 births
Living people
English women novelists
British women dramatists and playwrights
British chick lit writers
People from Nottinghamshire
21st-century English novelists
21st-century English women writers